The Dynastic Left (ID) was a Spanish political party founded in 1881 by elements from the Liberal Fusionist Party and the Democratic Progressive Party.

Between 1884 and 1886 most of its members returned to the Liberal Fusionist Party, now rebranded as simply the Liberal Party.

See also
Liberalism and radicalism in Spain

Bibliography

References

Defunct political parties in Spain
Defunct liberal political parties
Political parties established in 1881
Political parties disestablished in 1884
1881 establishments in Spain
1884 disestablishments in Spain